Life on the Lagoons, which deals with the history and topography of the watery area around the city of Venice, is the first book by the Scottish historian Horatio Brown.

The first edition was published in London in 1884, a revised second edition appeared ten years later in 1894, and there were further editions in 1900, 1904, and 1909.

The book was republished as a paperback in 2008.

Outline

Brown begins by setting out the natural topography of the lagoons, then their history from the year 452. He goes on to describe the human and animal life to be seen in and around the lagoons in his own day, based on his excursions, sometimes with his friend John Addington Symonds,  in a sandolo called Fisole, which had orange sails decorated with a fleur-de-lis.

The book is dedicated "To my Gondolier, ANTONIO SALIN, my constant companion in Venice and Venetia".

The chapter-headings of the second edition are: The Lagoons : their Nature and their History; The Gondola; The Traghetti; A Gondolier's Bank; Floods in the City; The Casa degli Spiriti; Sant' Elena; Osele; Sails and Sailmaking; A Vision of La Sensa; Processions; San Nicolo del Lido; The Doves of Saint Mark; The Ducal Palace; All Souls; The Madonna della Salute; Home Life; Popular Beliefs; Popular Poetry; A Regatta and its Sequel; and Mi Chiama il Mare.

Poem by Stevenson
Horatio Brown met Robert Louis Stevenson in 1881 at Davos, Switzerland, through their mutual friend John Addington Symonds. Stevenson took a liking to Brown and later sent him a copy of William Penn's Fruits of Solitude. Stevenson read Life on the Lagoons and wrote the poem "To H. F. Brown" to celebrate the book.

Now, thanks to your triumphant care,
Your pages clear as April air,
The sails, the bells, the birds, I know,
And the far-off Friulan snow

Critical reception
The British Quarterly Review said of the first edition in 1884 — 

The Literary World said in 1894 of the second edition —

Charles Dudley Warner, in A Library of the World's Best Literature (1896) says –

Editions
 Life on the Lagoons (London: Kegan Paul, Trench & Co., 1884), 1st edition
Life on the Lagoons (New York: Macmillan, 1894), 2nd edition
 Life on the Lagoons (London: 1900), 3rd edition
Life on the Lagoons (London: 1904), 4th edition
Life on the Lagoons (London: Rivingtons, 1909), 5th edition
Life on the Lagoons (London: Read Books, 2008), paperback,

External links
Horatio F. Brown, Life on the Lagoons (2008 reprint) - preview text online at books.google.com
Horatio F. Brown, Life on the Lagoons (3rd edition, 1900) - full text online at ebooksread.com

Notes

1884 non-fiction books
British travel books
Books about Venice
Scottish non-fiction books
English non-fiction books